Ivan Varone (born 11 October 1992) is an Italian professional footballer who plays as a midfielder.

Career
Varone made his Serie C debut for Savona on 31 August 2014 in a game against Ancona.

On 17 January 2019, he joined Carrarese on loan.

On 29 July 2019, he signed a 3-year contract with Reggio Audace.

References

External links
 

1992 births
Footballers from Naples
Living people
Italian footballers
Italian expatriate footballers
Association football midfielders
Santarcangelo Calcio players
A.C.N. Siena 1904 players
Olbia Calcio 1905 players
Savona F.B.C. players
A.S.D. Victor San Marino players
S.S. Chieti Calcio players
S.S. Racing Club Fondi players
Ternana Calcio players
Cosenza Calcio players
Carrarese Calcio players
A.C. Reggiana 1919 players
Panetolikos F.C. players
Serie B players
Serie C players
Serie D players
Super League Greece players
Expatriate footballers in Greece
Italian expatriate sportspeople in Greece